The Lithuanian Academy of Sciences or LMA is a state-funded independent organization in Lithuania dedicated for science and research. Its mission is to mobilize prominent scientists and initiate activities that would strengthen the welfare of Lithuania and contribute to the scientific, social, cultural and economic development of the country.

History 
The idea of establishing the Lithuanian Academy of Sciences was proposed in 1773 by Martynas Počobutas and other members of Vilnius University in the Grand Duchy of Lithuania, but it was not implemented due to wars and conflicts in the region. The idea of an independent institution for science and research was revived during the Lithuanian National Revival with the main proponents of it being the members of the Lithuanian Scientific Society, including Jonas Basanavičius and Jonas Šliūpas. However, the implementation began only in 1939, initially with the establishment of the Institute of the Lithuanian Language. The institute was a basis of the Lithuanian Academy of Sciences which was formally established on 16 January 1941. Its first president was Vincas Krėvė-Mickevičius.
In 1991, the Law on Research and Higher Education was adopted and LMA was reorganized.

Activities 
The LMA is governed by its charter which is approved by the Parliament of Lithuania. It can elect 120 members (under 75 years of age) and an unlimited number of foreign members as well as emeriti over 75 years of old.

The academy represents Lithuania in All European Academies, International Council for Science, European Academies' Science Advisory Council and InterAcademy Partnership. In addition to founding several scientific institutions and foundations, it issues publications and textbooks, sponsors symposia and conferences. It has established 15 memorial prizes and awards, encourages young scientists and students to engage in research by annually awarding 10 prizes to young scientists and 15 prizes to students. Since 2008, together with the Bank of Lithuania, it grants Vladas Jurgutis Award.

Structure 
LMA consists of the following scientific divisions:
 Humanities and Social Sciences
 Mathematical, Chemical and Physical Sciences
 Biological, Medical and Geosciences
 Agricultural and Forestry Sciences
 Technical Sciences

Publications 
Acta Medica Lituanica
Baltica : an international yearbook of Baltic Sea geology, geomorphology and paleontology
Biologija
Chemija
Ekologija
Energetika
Filosofija. Sociologija
Geografija
Geologija
Lituanistika
Pheromones
Menotyra
Žemės ūkio mokslai

References

External links
 Official website

1941 establishments in Lithuania
Research institutes in Lithuania
National academies of sciences
National academies of arts and humanities
Scientific organizations established in 1941
Members of the International Council for Science
Members of the International Science Council